Sandra Crousse (born 7 May 1966) is a Peruvian swimmer. She competed in the women's 100 metre freestyle and women's 200 metre freestyle events at the 1984 Summer Olympics.

References

External links
 

1966 births
Living people
Peruvian female freestyle swimmers
Olympic swimmers of Peru
Swimmers at the 1984 Summer Olympics
Place of birth missing (living people)